Claybrook House is a Grade II listed house at 136 New King's Road, Fulham, London.

History
It was built in the early 18th century, and the architect is not known. From 1811 to 1816 (at least),  it must have been a school as the diarist Louisa Bain was educated there from the age of seven to twelve.

It is next door to Northumberland House.

References

External links

Grade II listed houses in London
Houses in the London Borough of Hammersmith and Fulham
Houses completed in the 18th century
Grade II listed buildings in the London Borough of Hammersmith and Fulham
New King's Road